The 2023 U-20 Africa Cup of Nations final was a football match played between Senegal and The Gambia at the Cairo International Stadium in the capital city of Cairo, Egypt, on 11 March 2023 to determine the winners of the 17th edition of the biennial African international tournament for under-20 players.

Senegal defeated Gambia 2–0 to win the tournament.

Venue 

The final was held at the Cairo International Stadium in the Egyptian capital city of Cairo. Completed in 1960 and inaugurated on 23 July of the same year to mark 8 years since the 1952 Egyptian Revolution. With a capacity of 75,000 seats, it is programed to use Olympic-standard games.

Background 
The U-20 Africa Cup of Nations is the biennial African international youth football tournament organized by the Confederation of African Football for players under the age of 20. The 2023 edition of this tournament, colloquially referred to for short as the 2023 AFCON U20 or the 2023 U20 AFCON, is currently taking place in Egypt with this match concluding this edition of the tournament. == Route to the final ==

Match

Details 

Match rules
90 minutes.
30 minutes of extra time if necessary.
Penalty shoot-out if scores still level.
Maximum of twelve named substitutes.
Maximum of five substitutions, with a sixth allowed in extra time.{{refn|group=|Each team was given only three opportunities to make substitutions, with a fourth opportunity in extra time, excluding substitutions made at half-time, before the start of extra time and at half-time in extra time.

See also 
 2023 U-20 Africa Cup of Nations
 2023 Africa U-17 Cup of Nations

Notes

References 

2023 Africa U-20 Cup of Nations
Football in Cairo
Africa Cup of Nations
2023 in youth association football
Senegal national football team matches